It's Your 20th Television Anniversary, Charlie Brown is an animated documentary television special based on characters from the Peanuts comic strip. Hosted by Peanuts creator Charles M. Schulz, the television special originally aired on the CBS network on May 14, 1985. The special featured highlights of the Peanuts specials produced over the last twenty years.

Voice cast
 Brett Johnson as Charlie Brown
 Bill Melendez:as Snoopy

Cast
 Peter Robbins (Charlie Brown, 1963–69)
 Pamelyn Ferdin (Lucy Van Pelt, 1969–71)
 Stacy Ferguson (Sally Brown, 1984–85)
 Gini Holtzman (Peppermint Patty, 1984–85)
 Keri Houlihan (Marcie, 1984–85)
 Chris Inglis (Charlie Brown, 1971)
 Desirée Goyette
 Marine Jahan
 Chuck McCann
 Lee Mendelson
 Joey Scarbury
 Charles M. Schulz
 Jill Schulz

References

External links
 

Peanuts television documentaries
1985 television specials
1985 documentary films
1985 in American television
1980s American television specials
1980s animated television specials
Documentary specials